In heraldry, a bordure is a band of contrasting tincture forming a border around the edge of a shield, traditionally one-sixth as wide as the shield itself. It is sometimes reckoned as an ordinary and sometimes as a subordinary.

A bordure encloses the whole shield, with two exceptions: 
 When two coats of arms are combined by impalement, the bordure usually stops at the partition line and does not run down it, as shown in the arms of Kemp as Archbishop of Canterbury in the 15th century; this rule is considered a relic of the older practice of dimidiation. However, a notable exception to this rule can be seen in the arms of Thomas de Holland, Duke of Surrey (a nephew of Richard II) from a drawing of his seal, 1399, showing a differencing of a full bordure ermine, and a full bordure argent.
 A chief overlies a bordure, unless the bordure is added to a coat that previously included a chief, or so it is often said. In practice, the order in which things are to overlie each other can usually be inferred from the blazon.  For example, in the arms of Amber Valley Borough Council, the blazon describes the bordure before the chief, and the bordure does not surround the chief; while in the arms of the British Columbia Institute of Technology, the blazon specifies a chief ... within a bordure.

Like any ordinary or other charge, a bordure may be of a single plain tincture or divided.  Like any ordinary, it may be smooth or subjected to any of the lines of variation; it may form a field for other charges.  These variations are effectively exploited in the Scottish system of cadency.

Since it is very often used for cadency rather than to distinguish between original coats, the bordure is not strictly held to the rule of tincture; for example, many cadets of the French royal house, for example, bore red bordures on a blue field.  Rarely a bordure is of the same tincture as the field on which it lies; in this case the term "embordured" is employed.  This was a very unusual practice even centuries ago and is all but unheard-of today.

A bordure semy of some charge is shown as if it were charged with a great number of those charges, rather than the practice typical with a field, in which some of the charges are shown as "cut off" by the edges of the field.  This large number is to be taken as semy, and not as the precise number shown.

The bordure has no diminutive, though a bordure diminished is occasionally employed – as in 'Or; a diminished bordure vert; on a chief indented azure, two fleurs de lys or' (127th Field Artillery, US).  There is an example in blazon of "a narrow bordure" – Or; representations of two San human figures of red ochre, statant respectant, the hands of the innermost arms clasped, with upper arm, inner wrist, waist and knee bands argent; and a narrow border of red ochre  (Republic of South Africa).

In current sovereign flags

Notes

See also
 Bordure compone
 Orle

Heraldic ordinaries

fr:Liste de pièces héraldiques#Bordure